God Damn Evil is the seventeenth release and twelfth studio album by Christian metal band Stryper, produced by frontman Michael Sweet and released on April 20, 2018. Bass guitar was played by John O'Boyle as current bassist Perry Richardson could not due to scheduling conflicts.

Critical reception

Awarding the album four stars from CCM Magazine, Matt Connor writes, "Their unapologetic approach to stay true to their now classic rock/metal roots rewards longtime fans." Andie Hardee, giving the album three and a half stars at Jesus Freak Hideout, states, "As impressive as the musicianship is, the songs themselves are also enjoyable." Rating the album an 8.3 out of 10 by Sonic Perspectives, Alan Cox says, "Stryper is rocking so hard and well that even some close-minded skeptics are bound to be converted." Wayne Parry, reviewing for The Washington Post, responds, "At an age where many heavy metal wailers dial it back due to the strains of decades of high notes, singer and guitarist Michael Sweet doubles down on his other worldly vocals."

The name of the album has been the source of controversy and has caused some Christian music retailers and even Walmart to not stock physical CDs in their stores. Michael Sweet has responded by saying, "We're disappointed. Stryper has always been about making people think outside the box. Our new album title, God Damn Evil, is a statement that's needed in our society. We've seen evil rise to new levels and this title is simply a prayer request asking God to damn or condemn all the evil around us. Many chains have joined us in making such a statement. Walmart, unfortunately, has not. The odd thing is of all the chains out there we assumed Walmart would be one to understand exactly what our point and purpose is. Unfortunately not. Although we respect their decision and what's done is done, it's frustrating to see something that's meant for good get misinterpreted and misunderstood."

Track listing

Personnel 
Stryper
 Michael Sweet – lead vocals, lead guitars
 Robert Sweet – drums, backing vocals
 Oz Fox – lead guitars, backing vocals

Additional personnel
 Charles Foley – backing vocals
 John O'Boyle – bass guitar
 Paul McNamara – keyboards, synthesizer (Moog), backing vocals on "God Damn Evil"
 Danny Bernini – percussion, recording and engineering
 Matthew Bachand – death growl on "Take It to the Cross"
 Tyler Murello – backing vocals on "God Damn Evil"
 Kenny Lewis - additional editing

Charts

References 

2018 albums
Stryper albums
Obscenity controversies in music
Naming controversies
Christianity in popular culture controversies